The Plant Health Inspection Service is an agency within the Ministry of Rural Development and Food of the Greek government. It is responsible for regulation and inspection of imports and exports of plants for dietary, ornamental, other recreational, or any other purpose. The PHIS is responsible for liaising with other phytosanitary authorities in other countries around the world, and with treaty organisations such as the International Plant Protection Convention.

References

External links

Agriculture in Greece
Government of Greece
Phytosanitary authorities